Two ships of the Royal Australian Navy (RAN) have been named HMAS Norman. The second ship is named for the Norman River in Queensland.
, an N-class destroyer launched in 1940 and transferred to the Royal Navy in 1945
, a Huon-class minehunter launched in 1999 and commissioned but in reserve as of 2016

Battle honours
Ships named HMAS Norman are entitled to bear a four battle honours:
Indian Ocean 1942–44
East Indies 1944
Burma 1944–45
Okinawa 1945

References

Royal Australian Navy ship names